The Commonwealth of Australia Gazette is a printed publication of the Commonwealth Government of Australia, and serves as the official medium by which decisions of the executive arm of government, as distinct from legislature and judiciary, are promulgated.
Types of announcements in the Gazette include, appointments, promotions and transfers of persons to positions in the Australian Public Service (APS), previously "Commonwealth Public Service"; creation, dissolution and renaming of boards, departments and commissions within the APS; conferring of awards and honours to persons and organisations by the Government; calling of tenders and awarding of contracts by the Government.

The Gazette is published weekly. Each Gazette is numbered, and at the start of each calendar year the numbering begins again at No. 1.

History
The creation, publication and dissemination of a governmental gazette was one of a myriad of bureaucratic functions attendant on the Federation of Australia on 1 January 1901.

The first Commonwealth Gazette, dated 1 January 1901, was written by Robert Garran and published on 2 January 1901. It contained Queen Victoria's proclamation dated 17 September 1900, for the establishment of the Commonwealth, the announcement of the appointment of ministers and their respective offices, and of the appointment of the Governor-General and his staff. The appearance of the first Gazette was reported by newspapers in every state, some in considerable detail.

Some historic issues
The primary purpose of a Gazette was, and is, of the ordinary "housekeeping" of a large organisation; of little interest to any but employees and others immediately affected and, retrospectively, to historians, but on occasion of great moment to the whole population:
The second issue, termed "Extraordinary" was dated 23 January 1901, and consisted of a single page authorised by the Prime Minister, Edmund Barton, announcing the death of Her Majesty, Queen Victoria. A large number of Australian newspapers reported the contents of this Gazette verbatim. Issues 3 to 5, also termed "Extraordinary" were published on 24, 28 and 31 January 1901, and dealt with protocol to be observed relating to the Sovereign's death, mourning etc., and proclamation of the accession to the Throne of King and Emperor Edward the Seventh.
During the 1914 Constitutional crisis which resulted in the first double dissolution of the Australian parliament, newspapers cited the Gazette as an authoritative source of information.
On the eve of Australia's entry into the Great War of 1914–1918, enemy merchant shipping was notified in the Gazette of 5 August 1914 of "days of grace" whereby they could return to their home ports unhindered. Such preparations for World War I were reported in the Australian press.
With the heightening of tensions following aggressive actions by Germany, the Gazette published on 1 September 1939 a special issue detailing imposition of censorship of international communication, which was relayed by news channels. Official notification to the Australian public on 3 September 1939 of a state of war between Great Britain and Germany was reported extensively.

1974 to present
By 1974 the Gazette had become so large and unwieldy that it was decided to split it into four separate publications, numbered independently:
Government Notices Gazette is published weekly and covers all legislation, changes to Australian Government departments and other notices required under Commonwealth law. Their Numbers are prefixed "G" or "GN".
Special Notices Gazette may be published at any time, and usually consists of a single announcement. Their numbers are prefixed "S".
Periodic Notices Gazette may be published at any time, and consists of a set of notices relating to a specific subject. Their numbers are prefixed "P".
Australian Public Service Gazette is published weekly and includes notices of examination; and Australian Public Service and Parliamentary Service vacancies, transfers, promotions and terminations. Their Numbers are prefixed "PS".
Since 1974 a range of other gazettes has been issued by the Australian Government. Their number and titles have not been constant; the current (2017) list includes:
Government Purchasing
Business Gazette
Australian Securities and Investments Commission (ASIC) Gazette
Tariff Concessions Gazette
Chemical Gazette
Australian Pesticides and Veterinary Medicines Authority (APVMA) Gazette
Food Standards Gazette
APSjobs is a website which incorporates an electronic version of the APS Employment Gazette.

Historic
The Commonwealth Gazette for the years 1901–1957 has been digitised by the National Library of Australia and is available online through Trove.

See also
List of government gazettes

References

External links 
Various Commonwealth of Australia Gazette titles spanning the years 1901–2012 have been digitised by the National Library of Australia and are available online through Trove.

 Commonwealth of Australia Gazette (National : 1901 – 1973)
 Australian Government Gazette (National : 1973 – 1973)
 Australian Government Gazette. General (National : 1974 – 1977)
 Commonwealth of Australia Gazette. General (National : 1977 – 1987)
 Commonwealth of Australia Gazette. Government Notices (National : 1987 – 2012)
 Australian Government Gazette. Periodic (National : 1974 – 1977)
 Commonwealth of Australia Gazette. Periodic (National : 1977 – 2011)
 Australian Government Gazette. Public Service (National : 1974 – 1977)
 Commonwealth of Australia Gazette. Public Service (National : 1977 – 2007)
 Commonwealth of Australia Gazette. Australian Postal Commission Supplement (National : 1987 – 1989)
 Commonwealth of Australia Gazette. Australian Postal Corporation Supplement (National : 1989 – 1993)
 Job Information Circular (National : 1993 – 1998)
 Commonwealth of Australia Gazette. Australian Telecommunications Commission Supplement (National : 1987 – 1989)
 Commonwealth of Australia Gazette. Australian Telecommunications Corporation Supplement (National : 1989 – 1992)
 Commonwealth of Australia Gazette. Australian and Overseas Telecommunications Corporation Supplement (National : 1992 – 1993)
 Commonwealth of Australia Gazette. Telstra Corporation Limited Supplement (National : 1993 – 1997)
 Commonwealth of Australia Gazette. Department of Education, Training and Youth Affairs (National : 2001 – 2004)
 Australian Government Gazette. Special (National : 1974 – 1977)
 Commonwealth of Australia Gazette. Special (National : 1977 – 2012)
 Commonwealth of Australia Gazette. Australian Securities Commission (National : 1992 – 1998)
 Commonwealth of Australia Gazette. Australian Securities and Investments Commission (National : 1998 – 2001)
 Commonwealth of Australia Gazette. Business (National : 1987 – 2004)
 Commonwealth of Australia Gazette. Purchasing and Disposals (National : 1985 – 1997)
 Purchasing and Disposals Gazette (National : 1997 – 1998)
 Commonwealth Purchasing and Disposals Gazette (National : 1998 – 1999)
 Commonwealth of Australia Gazette. Tariff Concessions (National : 1983 – 2004)
 Commonwealth of Australia Gazette. FOI (National : 1983 – 1987)
 Commonwealth of Australia Gazette. Agricultural and Veterinary Chemicals (National : 1994 – 2010)
 Commonwealth of Australia Gazette. Chemical (National : 1990 – 2007)
 Australian Government Gazette. Chemical (National : 2007 – 2011)

Government gazettes of Australia
Government of Australia
Publications established in 1901